Ingegerd Olofsdotter of Sweden, also known as Irene, Anna and  Saint Anna  (1001 – 10 February 1050), was a Swedish princess and a Grand Princess of Kiev. She was the daughter of Swedish King Olof Skötkonung and Estrid of the Obotrites and the consort of Yaroslav I the Wise of Kiev. She is venerated as a saint in the Eastern Orthodox Church. Ingegerd or Saint Anna is often confused with the mother of Saint Vladimir “the Enlightener” of the Rus. This is mainly because Ingegerd and Yaroslav also had a son named Vladimir.  However, Saint Vladimir was the father of Ingegerd’s husband Yaroslav I “the Wise”, thus making her Saint Vladimir’s daughter-in-law.  Saint Vladimir was the son of Sviatoslav and Malusha.

Life
Ingegerd was born a princess in the court of  King Olof Skötkonung.  In 1015,  after Olaf II of Norway assumed the throne as King of Norway,
he proposed a royal marriage alliance. In 1016, noblemen of both countries tried to arrange a marriage between King Olaf and Princess Ingegerd.  Olof Skötkonung agreed at first but later he reneged. Rather he agreed to the marriage of his daughter, Astrid Olavsdatter to King Olaf. 

Olof Skötkonung subsequently arranged for the  marriage of Princess Ingegerd to the powerful  Grand Prince Yaroslav I the Wise of Novgorod with whom Sweden had a flourishing trade relationship. The marriage took place in 1019.  

Once in Kiev, Ingegerd had her name changed to the Greek Irene. According to several sagas, she received as a marriage gift Ladoga and adjacent lands, which later became known as Ingria, arguably a corruption of Ingegerd's name. She arranged for her father's cousin, jarl Ragnvald Ulfsson, to rule in her stead.

Together Ingegerd and Yaroslav had six sons and four daughters; three of the latter becoming Queens of France, Hungary, and Norway. The whole family is depicted in one of the frescoes of the Saint Sophia.

Death and burial
Ingegerd died on 10 February 1050. Upon her death, according to different sources, Ingegerd was buried in either Saint Sophia's Cathedral in Kiev or Cathedral of St. Sophia in Novgorod.

Sainthood

Ingegerd initiated the building of the Saint Sophia's Cathedral in Kiev (foundation laid in 1037). She also initiated the construction of Cathedral of St. Sophia in Novgorod (built between 1045 and 1050). Ingegerd was later declared a saint under the name of St. Anna  in Novgorod and Kiev. The reason for her sainthood was that she initiated the building of both cathedrals in Kiev and in Novgorod together with many other good deeds.

The following was stated by the church in reference to her sainthood:

St. Anna, Grand Duchess of Novgorod, She was the daughter of Swedish King Olaf Sketktung, the "All-Christian King," who did much to spread Orthodoxy in Scandinavia, and the pious Queen Astrida.

In Sweden she was known as Princess Indegard; she married Yaroslav I “the Wise“, Grand Prince of Kiev, who was the founder of the Saint Sophia Cathedral in 1016, taking the name Irene.

She gave shelter to the outcast sons of British  King Edmund, Edmund and  Edward, as well as the Norwegian prince Magnus, who later returned to Norway.

Her daughters were  Anna, Queen of France, Queen Anastasia of Hungary, and Queen Elizabeth (Elisiv) of Norway. The whole family was profoundly devout and pious.

She reposed in 1050 in the Cathedral of Holy Wisdom (St. Sophia) in Kiev, having been tonsured a monastic with the name of Anna.

As saint, her hymn goes:

And 4 stichera, in Tone I: Spec. Mel.: Joy of the ranks of heaven

O joy of the Swedish people, thou didst gladden the Russian realm, filling it with grace and purity, adorning its throne with majesty, lustrous in piety like a priceless gem set in a splendid royal crown.

Named  Ingegerd  in the baptismal waters, O venerable one, thou wast called  Irene  by thy Russian subjects, who perceived in thee the divine and ineffable peace; but when thou didst submit to monastic obedience, thou didst take the new name,  Anna,  after the honoured ancestor of Christ, the King of kings.

Wed in honourable matrimony, O holy Anna, thou didst live in concord with thy royal spouse, the right-believing and most wise Prince  Yaroslav;  and having born him holy offspring, after his repose thou didst betroth thyself unto the Lord as thy heavenly Bridegroom.

Disdaining all the allurements of vanity and donning the coarse robes of a monastic, O wondrous and sacred Anna, thou gavest thyself over to fasting and prayer, ever entreating Christ thy Master, that He deliver thy people from the all want and misfortune.

Feast days: 10 February, 4 October.

Children

Ingegerd had the following children:
 Elisiv of Kiev, queen of Norway
 Anastasia of Kiev, queen of Hungary
 Anne of Kiev, queen of France
 (possibly) Agatha, wife of Edward the Exile
 Vladimir of Novgorod
 Iziaslav I of Kiev
 Sviatoslav II of Kiev
 Vsevolod I, Prince of Kiev
 Igor Yaroslavich

References

Bibliography

External links

|-

Ingigarth 1001
1001 births
1050 deaths
Kievan Rus' princesses
Christian female saints of the Middle Ages
11th-century Christian saints
Burials at Saint Sophia Cathedral, Kyiv
House of Munsö
Rurik dynasty
11th-century Swedish women
11th-century Rus' people
11th-century Swedish people
11th-century Rus' women
Daughters of kings